The Hannibal Micropolitan Statistical Area, as defined by the United States Census Bureau, is an area consisting of two counties in northeast Missouri, anchored by the city of Hannibal.

As of the 2000 census, the μSA had a population of 37,915 and as of 2010 census, the population was 38,948.

Counties
Marion
Ralls

Communities

Places with more than 15,000 inhabitants
Hannibal (Principal city) Pop: 17,916

Places with 1,000 to 5,000 inhabitants
Palmyra Pop: 3,954
Vandalia (partial) Pop: 3,899
Monroe City (partial) Pop: 2,531

Places with less than 1,000 inhabitants
New London Pop: 974
Perry Pop: 693
Center Pop: 508
Rennselaer Pop: 228

Unincorporated places
Philadelphia
Saverton
Taylor
West Quincy

Townships

Marion County
 Fabius
 Liberty
 Mason
 Miller
 Round Grove
 South River
 Union
 Warren

Ralls County
 Center
 Clay
 Jasper
 Saline
 Salt River
 Saverton
 Spencer

Demographics
As of the census of 2000, there were 37,915 people, 14,802 households, and 10,307 families residing within the μSA. The racial makeup of the μSA was 94.45% White, 3.73% African American, 0.25% Native American, 0.23% Asian, 0.06% Pacific Islander, 0.14% from other races, and 1.14% from two or more races. Hispanic or Latino of any race were 0.78% of the population.

The median income for a household in the μSA was $34,434, and the median income for a family was $41,623. Males had a median income of $29,537 versus $20,415 for females. The per capita income for the μSA was $16,710.

See also
Missouri census statistical areas
Quincy, IL-MO Micropolitan Statistical Area

References

 
Marion County, Missouri
Ralls County, Missouri
Micropolitan areas of Missouri